Zeta Beta Tau is a Greek-letter social fraternity based in North America. It was founded on December 29, 1898. Originally a Zionist youth society, its purpose changed from the Zionism of the fraternity's early years when in 1954 the fraternity become nonsectarian and opened to non-Jewish members, changing its membership policy to include "All Men of Good Character" regardless of religious or ethnic background, while still being recognized as the first Jewish Fraternity.

History

Founding
The Zeta Beta Tau fraternity was led until his death by Richard J. H. Gottheil, a professor of languages at Columbia University and a Zionist. On December 29, 1898, he formed a Zionist youth society with a group of students from several New York City universities. Fifteen young men — among them Herman Abramowitz, Aaron Levy, Bernhard Bloch, David Liknaitz, Isidore Delson, Louis S Posner, Aaron Drucker, Bernhard Saxe, Bernard Ehrenreich, Herman Sheffield, Menachem Eichler, David Swick, Aaron Eiseman, Maurice Zellermayer and David Levine — gathered at the Jewish Theological Seminary on that date to found the organization.

The society was called Z.B.T., which referred to the first letters in the transliteration of the Hebrew phrase  "Zion Be-mishpat Tipadeh", which translated means "Zion shall be redeemed with judgment". This is taken from Isaiah 1:27 — "Zion be-mishpat tipadeh ve-shaveha be-tzedakah" (Zion shall be redeemed with judgment, and they that return of her, with righteousness"). The word "judgment" is sometimes translated as "justice". The meaning of Z.B.T. was listed in the American Jewish Committee's annual report as early as 1900–1901.

In 1903, Z.B.T. formally became Zeta Beta Tau, and its purpose shifted away from that of a Zionist youth organization as other Zionist organizations grew in prominence. The original Hebrew meaning of Z.B.T. is not esoteric. However, it was publicly revealed in the official written history of Zeta Beta Tau, Here's to Our Fraternity: One Hundred Years of Zeta Beta Tau, 1898–1998, by Marianne Rachel Sanua.
 
Zeta Beta Tau expanded rapidly. By 1909, it had established 13 chapters in the Northeastern United States and a 14th at Tulane University in New Orleans. In 1913, it established its first Canadian chapter at McGill University in Montreal and, in the same year, Zeta Beta Tau was first represented at the National Interfraternity Conference. Five years later, it founded its first West Coast chapter at the University of Southern California in Los Angeles. At the 1954 National Convention, the delegates amended Zeta Beta Tau's constitution, ritual and internal procedures both in theory and in practice to eliminate sectarianism as a qualification for membership.

Mergers
The Zeta Beta Tau has merged with four other national Jewish fraternities: Phi Alpha, Kappa Nu, Phi Sigma Delta and Phi Epsilon Pi, with chapters and colonies at over 90 campus locations. In 1959, Phi Alpha merged into Phi Sigma Delta, and in 1961 Kappa Nu merged into Phi Epsilon Pi. In 1969–70, Phi Sigma Delta and Phi Epsilon Pi merged into Zeta Beta Tau. Zeta Beta Tau's official name is "A Brotherhood of Kappa Nu, Phi Alpha, Phi Epsilon Pi, Phi Sigma Delta and Zeta Beta Tau".

Pledging abolished
Zeta Beta Tau abolished the institution of pledging in 1989 as a way to combat and eliminate hazing, and replaced the pledging process with one in which new members are accepted as brothers upon receiving a bid to the fraternity. Zeta Beta Tau's decision to do away with pledging did not involve an associate membership process, however. Once a brother joins the fraternity he will receive all rights and responsibilities as the rest of the chapter, and shall be eligible for any position within the chapter regardless of how long he has been a brother. This decision was made in response to the Age of Liability, in which extensive research on hazing shed light on how the culture of subservient pledging led to a number of deaths nationwide.

National philanthropies

Children's Miracle Network Hospitals (CMNH), which raises funds for children's hospitals in North America, was chosen as an official philanthropy of the fraternity during a Supreme Council meeting in summer 2002. Chapters host Get on the Ball events in which people donate to CMNH to sign a large inflatable beach ball.

The Zeta Beta Tau Foundation, a non-profit corporation exclusively committed to educational and charitable purposes that assist the Brothers of Zeta Beta Tau Fraternity, as another official philanthropic partner of the Fraternity. The foundation assists the fraternity by funding scholarships and academic and leadership programs to maximize their personal development and prepare them to be leaders of society. The scholarships and academic and leadership programs funded by the Foundation enhance the overall value of membership in Zeta Beta Tau Fraternity by complementing the collegiate educational experience.

Jewish Women International has been the third official philanthropic partner of ZBT, since 2015. JWI is the leading Jewish organization working to empower women and girls by ensuring and protecting their physical safety and economic security, promoting and celebrating inter-generational leadership, and inspiring civic participation and community engagement. JWI provides chapters with prevention programming to create stronger and safer Greek communities. JWI works with students to create sexual assault and dating violence prevention programming so that they understand how to ask for consent, so that every bystander knows to intervene, so that if a friend discloses after an assault students know how to respond, how to identify an abusive relationship, and build a culture of respect. ZBT chapters raise funds for JWI's National Library Initiative, which creates libraries in domestic violence shelters nationwide - transforming basic spaces into comforting havens stocked with colorful furniture, toys, computers and dozens of brand-new books.

Gift of Life Marrow Registry is another official partner of ZBT since 2017. It is an international bone marrow registry whose sole purpose is to find life-saving bone marrow transplants for those suffering from blood cancers such as leukemia and lymphoma. Gift of Life achieves this goal with the help of ZBT chapters from college campuses across the US who run registration drives and help find life-saving matches. Since the partnership began, ZBT brothers have added nearly 6,000 names to the donor registry, with nearly 70 matches and 11 life-saving transplants thus far.

Semi-annual brotherhood review vote
In conjunction with the 1989 abolition of pledging, ΖΒΤ National instituted the Semi-Annual Brotherhood Review Vote (SBRV). All ΖΒΤ chapters twice a year (once a semester) have a vote to see who, if anyone, should be removed from membership within a chapter. The ballots are counted by the president and an executive member of his choice. The criteria for voting during the SBRV are the Chapter Standards, which all chapters must make known to their membership. If a brother receives a simple majority of nay votes, he is expelled from the fraternity.

The Journey Brotherhood Program

Twenty years after ΖΒΤ eliminated pledging, the Supreme Council, based on feedback from undergraduates and alumni, voted to continue the evolution and development of what was initially called the Membership Development Program, then became the Brotherhood Program. The newest evolution is called the Journey. The Journey implements a number of significant changes. The Journey adds the position of Provost, in addition to the Brotherhood Development Director (BDD). In the past, the BDD was responsible for all education in the chapter. Now, the Provost teaches members about the history, values, and traditions of organization. The BDD oversees the Provost, and still is responsible for overall program.

Through the first six weeks of the Journey, newly initiated ΖΒΤ men learn the history of the fraternity, delve into the credo, mission statement and ritual, the skills needed to succeed in college, and how to make wise life decisions. Upon initiation, all ΖΒΤ brothers are given full rights and privileges, within days of accepting their bids. This is true for all versions of the Journey.

The Journey then continues to develop brothers for the next four years, offering education on building a better brotherhood and strong leadership skills. The Journey also offers a leadership track.

Local chapter or member misconduct 
In 1974, the Zeta Beta Tau chapter at Monmouth University, then known as Monmouth College, was suspended by the national headquarters after the death of a student during a pledge hazing ritual.

In 1988, the ZBT chapter at the University of Wisconsin-Madison held a mock slave auction featuring blackface and racial slurs. New pledges were dressed in wigs and "sold" for their services. This incident resulted in widespread campus protests against the fraternity, which was accused of creating a hostile environment for minorities.

In February 1988, the Judicial Inquiry Office of the University of Pennsylvania charged the Zeta Beta Tau fraternity with violating seven Pennsylvania statutes and University of Pennsylvania guidelines including sexual and racial harassment during a fraternity rush event on October 1, 1987. The fraternity was accused of hiring two African American women to perform before an audience of 100-200 men during the rush event. While the two women were undressing, the crowd yelled "Where did you get them niggers?" and other racist remarks.

In June 2016, the Miami University chapter of Zeta Beta Tau was suspended until May 2018 because of hazing violations.

In December 2017, Zeta Beta Tau discontinued recognition of the greater Philadelphia chapter (Alpha Beta), composed mostly of Temple University students. This came after a member of the fraternity was found dead in his off-campus residence from an accidental drug overdose.

In February 2018, the Cornell University chapter of Zeta Beta Tau was placed on probation for two years following an investigation into multiple reports of "pig roasts" in which men competed to try to sleep with and humiliate women they considered to be overweight.

In September 2018, Syracuse University's student newspaper published a video showing Zeta Beta Tau members forcibly spitting into pledges' mouths and covering their faces with a wet mop.

Warrior Beach Retreat controversy 
While in Panama City Beach, Florida, on April 17, 2015, for a spring formal, members of the fraternity's University of Florida chapter were accused of abusing disabled military veterans. The Warrior Beach Retreat provides wounded veterans a place to relax and heal. The event was allegedly disrupted by a band of fraternity brothers who were accused of disrespecting and dishonoring the veterans. According to Warrior Beach Retreat's founder, Linda Cope, the students were antagonizing veterans. She stated that some of the men made inappropriate comments to the spouses of veterans. One veteran said that he and his service dog were spat on, and that beer was poured on them from the 20th floor.

The University of Florida placed the ZBT chapter on interim suspension and charged the organization with a series of offenses as part of its formal investigation into the allegations of the event in Panama City Beach. Laurence Bolotin, the executive director of Zeta Beta Tau International, issued a statement on the organization's web site that noted, in part, "While the details of their actions are still under investigation, there is no doubt that some of our members engaged in ugly and unacceptable behavior. Their actions have no place in ΖΒΤ or anywhere, and they will not be tolerated. On behalf of our entire organization, I want to apologize to veterans, both those who were in Panama City Beach, and those who have felt the pain from afar, as well as to their families..." The president of the University of Florida, W. Kent Fuchs, called the actions of the fraternity members unacceptable and committed to a full investigation.

Ultimately, no criminal charges were filed and a University of Florida investigation resulted in the fraternity being charged with causing potential harm to others, obscenity and public intoxication. One of the students present said they were not even aware that there was a Wounded Warrior's beach retreat. The university said that the immediate suspension of the chapter was primarily for safety reasons because of the high number of threats made to the chapter and its members after news of the incident surfaced. Zeta Beta Tau at the University of Florida has since been re-formed.

University of California, Los Angeles Controversy 
In August 2018, the ZBT National Fraternity and the chapter at the University of California, Los Angeles, were sued for negligence, assault, battery and intentional infliction of emotional distress. The lawsuit also encompassed the Sigma Alpha Epsilon fraternity as well as UCLA. The lawsuit stemmed from the continuous denial and "sweeping under the rug" of complaints regarding rape and sexual assault and failing to adhere to their policies regarding alcohol consumption and abuse.

Notable alumni

Chapters

Zeta Beta Tau has 82 chapters and colonies in the United States and Canada. The state with the most chapters is New York. Currently, the oldest active chapter is Gamma at New York University. In 2022, the largest ΖΒΤ chapter was Lambda at The University of Texas at Austin.

See also
 List of social fraternities and sororities
 List of Jewish fraternities and sororities

References

External links
 

 
Student organizations established in 1898
Student societies in the United States
North American Interfraternity Conference
Historically Jewish fraternities in the United States
City College of New York
Fraternities and sororities based in Indianapolis
1898 establishments in New York (state)
Jewish organizations established in the 19th century